Sydney was a railway station in Sydney, Nova Scotia, Canada.

The building was originally owned by Canadian National Railway and later used by Via Rail Canada until the discontinuance of passenger train service to Sydney in 1990. The property was later  owned by a numbered company, 3046975 Nova Scotia Ltd., which is controlled by Patrick Donovan, a real estate developer.

The station building was demolished on October 31, 2020. The property is now owned by Somerled Properties and DORA Construction owner Donald MacDonald.

References

Via Rail stations in Nova Scotia
Transport in the Cape Breton Regional Municipality
Buildings and structures in the Cape Breton Regional Municipality